The following are the appointments to various Canadian Honours of 2016. Usually, they are announced as part of the New Year and Canada Day celebrations and are published within the Canada Gazette during year. This follows the custom set out within the United Kingdom which publishes its appoints of various British Honours for New Year's and for monarch's official birthday. However, instead of the midyear appointments announced on Victoria Day, the official birthday of the Canadian Monarch, this custom has been transferred with the celebration of Canadian Confederation and the creation of the Order of Canada.

However, as the Canada Gazette publishes appointment to various orders, decorations and medal, either Canadian or from Commonwealth and foreign states, this article will reference all Canadians so honoured during the 2016 calendar year.

Provincial Honours are not listed within the Canada Gazette, however they are listed within the various publications of each provincial government. Provincial honours are listed within the page.

The Order of Canada

Termination of an appointment of the Order of Canada
 Ranjit Kumar Chandra

Companions of the Order of Canada

 Brenda Andrews, C.C.
 The Honourable Lloyd Axworthy, P.C., C.C., O.M. - This is a promotion within the Order
 Atom Egoyan, C.C. - This is a promotion within the Order
 Angela Hewitt, C.C. - This is a promotion within the Order
 Margaret MacMillan, C.C. - This is a promotion within the Order
 Arthur B. McDonald, C.C., O.Ont. - This is a promotion within the Order
 Barbara Sherwood Lollar, C.C.

Officer of the Order of Canada

 Marcel Boyer, O.C.
 Julie Dickson, O.C.
 Nassif Ghoussoub, O.C.
 Magella Gros-Louis, O.C., O.Q.
 Dany Laferrière, O.C., O.Q.
 Guy Latraverse, O.C., C.Q.
 Brian M. Levitt, O.C.
 Richard H. McLaren, O.C.
 Daniel Poliquin, O.C. - This is a promotion within the Order
 The Honourable Richard Scott, O.C., O.M.
 Frances Alice Shepherd, O.C.
 Jennifer Anne Stoddart, O.C.
 Donald John Taylor, O.C. - This is a promotion within the Order
 Mary Anne White, O.C.
 Kenneth Armson, O.C.
 Ellen Bialystok, O.C.
 Yvon Charest, O.C.
 Gregory Charles, O.C.
 John Richard English, O.C. - This is a promotion within the Order
 Eduardo L. Franco, O.C.
 Jacques Godbout, O.C., C.Q.
 Serge Godin, O.C., O.Q. - This is a promotion within the Order
 Robert Arthur Gordon, O.C., O.Ont.
 Philippe Gros, O.C.
 Piers Guy Paton Handling, O.C., O.Ont.
 Roberta L. Jamieson, O.C. - This is a promotion within the Order
 Nathalie Lambert, O.C.
 Andres Lozano, O.C.
 John McCall MacBain, O.C.
 John McGarry, O.C.
 Rene Theophile Nuytten, O.C., O.B.C.
 The Honourable Dennis R. O’Connor, O.C.
 Sophie May Pierre, O.C., O.B.C.
 Thomas Quinn, O.C.
 Noralou Roos, O.C. - This is a promotion within the Order
 Abraham Anghik Ruben, O.C.
 Tsun-Kong Sham, O.C.
 Dorothy Shaw, O.C.
 Anthony von Mandl, O.C., O.B.C.
 The Honourable Warren Winkler, O.C., O.Ont.
 Ronald J. Wonnacott, O.C.

Members of the Order of Canada

 George Baird, C.M.
 Bernard Bélanger, C.M.
 David Bissett, C.M., A.O.E.
 Denise Bombardier, C.M., C.Q.
 Joseph Boyden, C.M.
 Laura Brandon, C.M.
 Sophie Brochu, C.M.
 Phyllis Bruce, C.M.
 Rudy Buttignol, C.M.
 Barbara Byers, C.M.
 The Honourable Catherine Callbeck, C.M.
 Robert Campbell, C.M.
 Susan M. W. Cartwright, C.M.
 Antoni Cimolino, C.M.
 Jack L. Cockwell, C.M.
 Patricia Cranton, C.M.
 The Honourable Joseph Z. Daigle, C.M.
 Wade Davis, C.M.
 Rollande Desbois, C.M.
 Diane Dufresne, C.M., C.Q.
 Ivan Kenneth Eyre, C.M., O.M.
 Meric Gertler, C.M.
 Ted Grant, C.M.
 Barbara Hall, C.M.
 Odetta Heyn, C.M.
 Jean-Marc Lalonde, C.M.
 Pierre H. Lessard, C.M.
 Peter S. Li, C.M.
 Rohinton Mistry, C.M.
 John Mulvihill, C.M.
 Marie-José Nadeau, C.M.
 Audrey O’Brien, C.M.
 Sandra Paikowsky, C.M.
 Erna Paris, C.M.
 Helen Fogwill Porter, C.M.
 Placide Poulin, C.M.
 Louise Richer, C.M.
 Kent Roach, C.M.
 Cathy Roozen, C.M., A.O.E.
 Morris Rosenberg, C.M.
 Fiona Amaryllis Sampson, C.M.
 P. Kim Sturgess, C.M.
 Noreen Taylor, C.M.
 Faye Thomson, C.M.
 Peter Valentine, C.M.
 Helen Vari, C.M.
 Douglas Ward, C.M.
 Richard Weber, C.M.
 Frederic Wien, C.M.
 Joseph Georges Arsenault, C.M., O.P.E.I.
 Salah John Bachir, C.M.
 Isabel Bassett, C.M., O.Ont.
 Gerald Batist, C.M.
 Geoffrey Battersby, C.M.
 Françoise Baylis, C.M.
 Gregory S. Belton, C.M., C.V.O.
 Johanne Berry, C.M.
 Timothy Borlase, C.M., O.N.L.
 Richard Frederick Bradshaw, C.M.
 Peter Bregg, C.M.
 Donald C. Brinton, C.M.
 Michael Budman, C.M.
 Cassie Campbell, C.M.
 Mariette Carrier-Fraser, C.M.
 Sharon Carstairs, P.C., C.M.
 Neena L. Chappell, C.M.
 Zita Cobb, C.M.
 Mary Cornish, C.M.
 L. Mark Cullen, C.M.
 Madeleine Delaney-LeBlanc, C.M.
 Patricia Demers, C.M.
 Serge Denoncourt, C.M.
 Charlotte Diamond, C.M.
 Rupert James Duchesne, C.M.
 Michael Eskin, C.M.
 Carole Anne Estabrooks, C.M.
 Yvon Ethier, C.M.
 Gerald Richard Fagan, C.M., O.Ont.
 Linda Marie Fedigan, C.M.
 Marie Esther Fortier, C.M.
 Stephen Gaetz, C.M.
 Ned Goodman, C.M.
 Don Green, C.M.
 Paul John Perry Guloien, C.M.
 Barbara Hannigan, C.M.
 Gregory Hanson, C.M.
 Susan Johnson, C.M.
 Diane Juster, C.M.
 Eli Kassner, C.M.
 Elaine Keillor, C.M.
 Hassan Khosrowshahi, C.M., O.B.C.
 Michael Charles Klein, C.M.
 Laurier Lacroix, C.M.
 Mark Levine, C.M.
 Shar Levine, C.M.
 Sidney B. Linden, C.M., O.Ont.
 Gail Dexter Lord, C.M.
 Steve Lurie, C.M.
 Bruce MacKinnon, C.M., O.N.S.
 Harriet MacMillan, C.M.
 Joe Mancini, C.M.
 Stephanie Mancini, C.M.
 Roger L. Martin, C.M.
 Don McKellar, C.M.
 Linda E. McKnight, C.M.
 Emily Molnar, C.M.
 Terrence Montague, C.M., C.D.
 Richard Ian Guy Morrison, C.M.
 The Honourable Graydon Nicholas, C.M., O.N.B
 Niels Ole Nielsen, C.M.
 Shane O’Dea, C.M., O.N.L.
 Robert Pace, C.M.
 Eric L. Peterson, C.M.
 Michel Picher, C.M.
 Deborah Poff, C.M.
 Andrew M. Pringle, C.M.
 Daniel Reiss, C.M.
 Howard Warren Rundle, C.M.
 Robert J. Sawyer, C.M.
 Kathryn Shields, C.M., O.B.C.
 Ilkay Silk, C.M.
 Jean Swanson, C.M.
 Kathleen Patricia Taylor, C.M.
 Richard Tremblay, C.M., C.Q.
 Louis Vachon, C.M.
 The Honourable Geraldine Van Bibber, C.M.
 David Vaver, C.M.
 James W. St. G. Walker, C.M.
 Michael A. Walker, C.M.
 Howard Wetston, C.M.
 Catharine Whiteside, C.M.
 Marie Wilson, C.M.
 James G. Wright, C.M.
 Glenda Yeates, C.M.

Order of Military Merit

Commanders of the Order of Military Merit

 Lieutenant-General Michael John Hood, C.M.M., C.D.
 Major-General Christian Juneau, C.M.M., M.S.M, C.D. - This is a promotion within the Order
 Rear-Admiral John Frederick Newton, C.M.M., M.S.M, C.D. - This is a promotion within the Order
 Rear-Admiral William Truelove, C.M.M., C.D. - This is a promotion within the Order
 Lieutenant-General Christine Theresa Whitecross, C.M.M., M.S.M, C.D. - This is a promotion within the Order

Officers of the Order of Military Merit

 Lieutenant-Colonel Roy Armstrong, O.M.M., C.D.
 Colonel Timothy James Bishop, O.M.M., M.S.M., C.D.
 Colonel Marie Annabelle Jennie Carignan, O.M.M., M.S.M., C.D.
 Colonel Peter Samson Dawe, O.M.M., M.S.M., C.D.
 Brigadier-General Luis Alberto Botelho de Sousa, O.M.M., C.D.
 Lieutenant-Colonel George Heber Gillam, O.M.M., C.D.
 Lieutenant-Colonel Carla Harding, O.M.M., C.D.
 Captain(N) Joseph Jeannot Hervé Jean, O.M.M., C.D.
 Major Joseph Fernand Phillippe Leclerc, O.M.M., M.S.M., C.D.
 Major John Allison Lewis, O.M.M., C.D.
 Colonel David William Lowthian, O.M.M., M.S.M., C.D.
 Colonel Derek Alan Macaulay, O.M.M., C.D.
 Colonel Scott Andrew Mcleod, O.M.M., M.S.M., C.D.
 Captain(N) Marta Beattie Mulkins, O.M.M., C.D.
 Brigadier-General Joseph Paul Alain Pelletier, O.M.M., M.S.M., C.D.
 Brigadier-General Neville Edward Russell, O.M.M., C.D.
 Colonel Érick David Simoneau, O.M.M., M.S.M., C.D.
 Colonel Michel-Henri St-Louis, O.M.M., M.S.M., C.D.
 Colonel Robert Daren Keith Walker, O.M.M., M.S.C., C.D.
 Lieutenant-Commander John Aubrey Williston, O.M.M., M.S.M., C.D.
 Captain(N) Jeffery Blair Zwick, O.M.M., C.D.

Members of the Order of Military Merit

 Chief Petty Officer 1st Class David Ronald Arsenault, M.M.M., C.D.
 Sergeant Stephen Claude Joseph Bates, M.M.M., C.D.
 Chief Warrant Officer Robert Joseph Beaudry, M.M.M., C.D.
 Warrant Officer Timothee David Bérubé, M.M.M., M.M.V., C.D.
 Warrant Officer Morgan Frans Biderman, M.M.M., C.D.
 Chief Warrant Officer Mario Paul Bizier, M.M.M., C.D.
 Chief Petty Officer 2nd Class Colin Philip Bond, M.M.M., C.D.
 Chief Warrant Officer Joseph Jacques Boucher, M.M.M., C.D.
 Warrant Officer Joseph Serge François Brunet, M.M.M., C.D.
 Master Warrant Officer Todd Barry Buchanan, M.M.M., M.S.M., C.D.
 Chief Warrant Officer Willard John Buchanan, M.M.M., C.D.
 Major Lucie Marie Françoise Burelle, M.M.M., C.D.
 Chief Petty Officer 1st Class Norman William Cawthra, M.M.M., C.D.
 Chief Warrant Officer Marc André Corriveau, M.M.M., C.D.
 Chief Warrant Officer Edward Joseph John Curtis, M.M.M., C.D.
 Warrant Officer Scott Alexander Daigle, M.M.M., C.D.
 Chief Warrant Officer Mary Elizabeth Demetruk, M.M.M., C.D.
 Captain Joseph Robert Alain Deslauriers, M.M.M., C.D.
 Warrant Officer Stephen Gerald Deveau, M.M.M., C.D.
 Warrant Officer Winston Wade Dominie, M.M.M., C.D.
 Master Warrant Officer Dianne Margaret Doyle, M.M.M., C.D.
 Master Warrant Officer Andrew Jack Durnford, M.M.M., C.D.
 Master Warrant Officer Dana Robert Eagles, M.M.M., C.D.
 Warrant Officer Joseph Gaetan Philippe Dessureault jr., M.M.M., C.D.
 Master Warrant Officer Michael Patrick Forest, M.M.M., M.S.M., C.D.
 Master Warrant Officer Michael Fuentespina, M.M.M., C.D.
 Ranger Donald Gourlay, M.M.M., C.D.
 Petty Officer 2nd Class John Vincent Cotter Gouthro, M.M.M., C.D.
 Warrant Officer Tracy Leigh Shyan Graham, M.M.M., C.D.
 Captain Kevin Wayne Gregory, M.M.M., C.D.
 Warrant Officer Renee Hansen, M.M.M., C.D.
 Chief Petty Officer 2nd Class Stephen Harold Haughn, M.M.M., C.D.
 Warrant Officer Jonathan Douglas Hawtin, M.M.M., C.D.
 Chief Warrant Officer Darren John Hessell, M.M.M., C.D.
 Chief Warrant Officer Garth Edward Hoegi, M.M.M., C.D.
 Captain Carl Homer, M.M.M., C.D.
 Warrant Officer Kimberlee Jones, M.M.M., C.D.
 Warrant Officer Cory Grant Kavanagh, M.M.M., C.D.
 Chief Warrant Officer Joseph Réal Luc Lacombe, M.M.M., C.D.
 Chief Warrant Officer Joseph Robert Bernard Lafontaine, M.M.M., C.D.
 Master Warrant Officer William Edward Lang, M.M.M., C.D.
 Master Warrant Officer Gary Steven Leblanc, M.M.M., C.D.
 Major Line Michele Lebœuf, M.M.M., C.D.
 Chief Warrant Officer Joseph Germain Daniel Legault, M.M.M., C.D.
 Warrant Officer Patrick André Lemieux, M.M.M., C.D.
 Master Warrant Officer Grant Clarence Lewis, M.M.M., C.D.
 Petty Officer 1st Class Marie Stephanie Dawn Mackay, M.M.M., C.D.
 Warrant Officer Karen Margaret MacLean, M.M.M., C.D.
 Master Warrant Officer Nadia MacQueen, M.M.M., C.D.
 Warrant Officer Joseph James William Lorne McAdam, M.M.M., C.D.
 Chief Petty Officer 2nd Class David Kenneth McAlpine, M.M.M., C.D.
 Master Warrant Officer Mark Douglas Mclennan, M.M.M., C.D.
 Master Warrant Officer Patrick William Moran, M.M.M., C.D.
 Lieutenant Karen Deborah Mullen, M.M.M., C.D.
 Major David Arthur Muralt, M.M.M., C.D.
 Master Warrant Officer Thomas Kincaid Neill, M.M.M., C.D.
 Warrant Officer Robert Harold John Peldjak, M.M.M., C.D.
 Chief Warrant Officer Joseph Gerald Donald Pelletier, M.M.M., C.D.
 Warrant Officer Alessandro Pacifico Pellizzari, M.M.M., C.D.
 Major Jaime Phillips, M.M.M., C.D.
 Master Warrant Officer Didier Jean-Paul Louis Pignatel, M.M.M., C.D.
 Sergeant Jeremy Pinchin, M.M.M., S.M.V., C.D.
 Warrant Officer Claude Pierre Provost, M.M.M., C.D.
 Master Warrant Officer Wallace Rideout, M.M.M., C.D.
 Major Mark William Rosin, M.M.M., C.D.
 Warrant Officer Stuart John Dalton Russelle, M.M.M., C.D.
 Chief Warrant Officer Jeffrey Harold Saunders, M.M.M., C.D.
 Ranger Martin Scott, M.M.M., C.D.
 Master Warrant Officer Keith Alan Sexstone, M.M.M., C.D.
 Ranger Stanley Robert Stephens, M.M.M., C.D.
 Captain Thomas Henry Sutton, M.M.M., C.D.
 Chief Warrant Officer Robert Peter Michael Talach, M.M.M., C.D.
 Major Douglas Michael Thorlakson, M.M.M., C.D.
 Chief Warrant Officer Christopher Todd Tucker, M.M.M., C.D.
 Warrant Officer Kirby Graham Vincent, M.M.M., C.D.
 Petty Officer 2nd Class Jody Patrick Waterfield, M.M.M., C.D.
 Captain Patrick Joseph White, M.M.M., C.D.
 Chief Warrant Officer Michael James Whitman, M.M.M., C.D.
 Master Warrant Officer Grace Lydia Wille, M.M.M., C.D.
 Chief Petty Officer 2nd Class David Wilson, M.M.M., C.D.

Order of Merit of the Police Forces

Commander of the Order of Merit of the Police Forces

 Commissioner J. Vincent N. Hawkes, C.O.M. - This is a promotion within the Order

Officers of the Order of Merit of the Police Forces

 Deputy Commissioner Bradley Blair, O.O.M.
 Deputy Commissioner Craig Steven MacMillan, O.O.M. - This is a promotion within the Order
 Chief Douglas A. Palson, O.O.M.
 Chief Superintendent Jennifer Anne Strachan, O.O.M.

Members of the Order of Merit of the Police Forces

 Chief Superintendent Rosemary Abbruzzese, M.O.M.
 Chief Terry Ray Armstrong, M.O.M.
 Superintendent Paul A. Beesley, M.O.M.
 Daniel J. Bowman, M.O.M.
 Sergeant Howard James Burns, M.O.M.
 Corps Sergeant Major Darren C. Campbell, M.O.M.
 Inspector Lawrence Cope, M.O.M.
 Superintendent Joseph Bernard Serge Côté, M.O.M.
 Chief Stephen E. Covey, M.O.M.
 Chief Superintendent David Thomas Critchley, M.O.M.
 Sergeant Robert C. Daly, M.O.M.
 Superintendent Kari Dart, M.O.M.
 Director Denis Desroches, M.O.M.
 Chief Shawn Devine, M.O.M.
 Susan C. Double, M.O.M.
 Deputy Chief Nishan J. Duraiappah, M.O.M.
 Inspector Stuart K. Eley, M.O.M.
 Deputy Chief Timothy Farquharson, M.O.M.
 Inspector Patrick S. Flanagan, M.O.M.
 Staff Sergeant Douglas Frank Gambicourt, M.O.M.
 Chief Constable Ralph Leonard Goerke, M.O.M.
 Superintendent Nancy Goodes-Ritchie, M.O.M.
 Superintendent James Ian Hardy, M.O.M.
 Chief Constable Wayne Douglas Holland, M.O.M.
 Staff Sergeant Douglas James Houston, M.O.M.
 Staff Sergeant Wilfred E. Hurren, M.O.M.
 Deputy Chief David Jarvis, M.O.M.
 Inspector Edmund P. Kodis, M.O.M.
 Deputy Director Bernard Lamothe, M.O.M.
 Chief Bryan M. Larkin, M.O.M.
 Staff Sergeant Robert Ellwood Lemon, M.O.M.
 Inspector David J. Lucas, M.O.M.
 Sergeant Stephen MacDonald, M.O.M.
 Superintendent Mandip Singh Mann, M.O.M.
 Constable David Marchand, M.O.M.
 Superintendent Glenn Arnold Martindale, M.O.M.
 Sergeant David Bruce Muirhead, M.O.M.
 Corporal Jacques M. A. Neri, M.O.M.
 Staff Superintendent Randall Patrick, M.O.M.
 Inspector Jamie Alan David Pearce, M.O.M.
 Sergeant Denis Perrier, M.O.M.
 Chief Superintendent Richard A. J. Philbin, M.O.M.
 Chief Inspector Pierre Pinel, M.O.M.
 Chief Darryl J. Pinnell, M.O.M.
 Sergeant Clifford T. Priest, M.O.M.
 Deputy Chief Constable Satwinder Rai, M.O.M.
 Staff Sergeant Brian John Reed, M.O.M.
 Inspector Daniel W. Ritchie, M.O.M.
 Staff Sergeant Thomas Robb, M.O.M.
 Superintendent John Alfred Robin, M.O.M.
 Inspector David B. Saunders, M.O.M.
 Commander David Shane, M.O.M.
 Lisa Shipley, M.O.M.
 Superintendent Konrad Lionel Shourie, M.O.M.
 Sergeant Marty Roy Singleton, M.O.M.
 Superintendent Guy Warwick Slater, M.O.M.
 Superintendent Hilton Basil Smee, M.O.M.
 Superintendent Wayne Alexander Sutherland, M.O.M.
 Sergeant Robert Montgomery Tan, M.O.M.
 Inspector Karl Thomas, M.O.M.
 Chief Superintendent Sandra Anne Thomas, M.O.M.
 Deputy Chief Paul VandeGraaf, M.O.M.
 Staff Sergeant Lauren Weare, M.O.M.
 Sergeant William Michael James Whalen, M.O.M.
 Constable Andrew Preston Wilder, M.O.M.
 Superintendent Peter C. Yuen, M.O.M.

Most Venerable Order of the Hospital of St. John of Jerusalem

Knights and Dames of the Order of St. John
 Her Honour the Honourable Jocelyne Roy-Vienneau, O.N.B.
 Her Honour the Honourable Lois Mitchell, C.M., A.O.E.
 Her Honour the Honourable Janice Filmon, C.M., O.M.
 Herman Hung Choi Ho, M.B., BC
 Commander (Retired) Alaric John Martin Woodrow, C.D., R.C.N. 
 His Honour the Honourable Joseph Michel Doyon, Q.C.

Commanders of the Order of St. John
 Adam James Dickinson Carter, ON
 Anthony Owen Lea, ON
 Richard Joseph Neville, ON
 Douglas Anthony Alberts, ON
 Alan Thomas Blundell, ON
 Nancy Katherine Hutchinson, ON
 Stewart Kellock, M.O.M., C.D., ON
 Michael John Lawrence, ON

Officers of the Order of St. John
 Robert Boily, QC
 Judith Anne Burtch, ON
 Pierre Fluet, QC
 Edmond Youie-Man Lee, BC
 Kristeen McKee, ON
 Karen Marie Mueller, ON
 John Buckingham Newman, ON
 Sonia Sizto, BC
 Sherry Lynn Versnick, ON
 Hubert William Dawe, NL
 Harvey Fields, ON
 Kevin Morgan, ON
 Sergeant Renee Anthony Ongcangco, ON

Members of the Order of St. John
 Richard William Spuzak, SK
 Daniel Blouin, QC
 Thomas William Carrique, ON
 Kenneth Kin Kuen Chan, BC
 Deborah Ann Coligan, ON
 Gareth Nicholas Gilson, BC
 Chief Warrant Officer John William Haldorson, C.D., BC
 Harriet May McFadyean Hay, BC
 Susan Sara Joy Hicks, ON
 Deborah Ann Howard, ON
 Patricia Anne Ireland, ON
 Major Bradley Donald Kempston, C.D., ON
 Justin Stephen Migchels, ON
 Jaroslaw Piwowarczyk, ON
 Master Corporal Érick Joseph Roger Ulderic Roberge, ON 
 Lieutenant-Colonel (Retired) Jeffrey Frances Shaver, C.D., ON
 James Arthur Skinner, BC
 Jon Steven Warland, ON
 Lieutenant(N) (Retired) Patrick Alan Warner, C.D., ON 
 Brian Baker, ON
 Peter Harvey Dwight Blok, ON
 Mary Patricia Murray Brown, BC
 James Daniel Coucill, SK
 Lori Lynn Coverdale, ON
 Kanisha Cayla Cruz-Kan, MB 
 Erin Dembinski, ON
 Alison Dale Dery, MB
 Michael Joseph Gosselin, ON
 Major (Retired) Louis Ernest Grimshaw, C.D., ON
 Mary Kingston, NS
 Claire Elizabeth Mackley, MB
 Karen Joanne McGlashan, ON 
 Frederick William Musselwhite, BC
 Sheena Margaret Osborne, BC
 Jemimah Zion Del Mundo Pangan, MB
 John Gregory Peters, MVO, ON 
 Ken Reid, NL
 Jessie Erin Rumble, ON
 Anthony Richard Schindle, BC
 Andrew Wright Stanzel, ON
 Jillian Louise Stevenson, ON
 Sing Lim Yeo, O.B.C., BC

Provincial Honours

National Order of Québec

Grand Officers of the National Order of Québec

 Alanis Obomsawin, G.O.Q.
 Louise Otis, G.O.Q.

Officers of the National Order of Québec

 Serge Bouchard, O.Q.
 Louise Dandurand, O.Q.
 Denis de Belleval, O.Q.
 Gilles Duceppe, O.Q.
 The Honourable Liza Frulla, P.C., O.Q.
 Jean Grondin, O.Q.
 Fernand Ouellette, O.Q.
 André Parent, O.Q.
 John Parisella, O.Q.
 Robert Parizeau, O.Q.
 Lorraine Pintal, O.Q.

Honorary Officer of the National Order of Québec
 Patrick Bruel, O.Q.

Knight of the National Order of Québec

 Violette Alarie, C.Q.
 Gerald Batist, C.Q.
 Jean Beaudin, C.Q.
 Léopold Beaulieu, C.Q.
 Mohamed Benhaddadi, C.Q.
 Michel Bergeron, C.Q.
 Boucar Diouf, C.Q.
 Anne-Marie Dussault, C.Q.
 Jacques Fortin, C.Q.
 Jean-François Lapointe, C.Q.
 Rakia Laroui, C.Q.
 Alain Pinsonneault, C.Q.
 Placide Poulin, C.Q.
 Dominique Rankin, C.Q.
 Sister Angèle Rizzardo, C.Q.
 Hélène Sioui Trudel, C.Q.
 Yves Sirois, C.Q.
 Bruny Surin, C.Q.
 Laure Waridel, C.Q.
 Jean Wilkins, C.Q.

Honorary Knight of the National Order of Québec
 Carlos Eduardo Represas de Almeida, C.Q.

Saskatchewan Order of Merit

 JoAnne Bannatyne‐Cugnet, S.O.M.  
 Valerie Creighton, S.O.M.  
 Steve Dechka, S.O.M.  
 Keith Downey, O.C., F.R.S.C., S.O.M.  
 Isabelle Impey, S.O.M.  
 George Lafond, S.O.M.  
 Eldon McIntyre, S.O.M.  
 Wilf Perreault, S.O.M.  
 Gordon Rawlinson, C.M., S.O.M.

Order of Ontario

 Peter A. Adamson  Surgical Specialist in Otolaryngology
 Mehran Anvari  Surgical Robotics Pioneer
 Donovan Bailey  Track and Field Icon
 Jennifer Bond  Professor of Law and Human Rights Advocate
 Angèle Brunelle  Advocate for Northwest Ontario's Francophone Community
 Ronald F. Caza  Lawyer and Defender of Francophone Linguistic Rights
 Anthony Kam Chuen Chan  Pediatric Hematologist and Scientist
 Ethel Côté  Entrepreneur, Volunteer and Community leader
 Jim Estill  Entrepreneur and Philanthropist
 Carol Finlay  Anglican Priest and Education Advocate
 Cheryl Forchuk  Scholar in the Fields of Homelessness, Poverty and Mental Health
 Dorothée Gizenga  International Development Expert and Human Rights Advocate
 Shirley Greenberg  Lawyer and Women's Rights Advocate
 Robert Pio Hajjar  Motivational Speaker
 Greta Hodgkinson  Prima Ballerina
 Dorothy Anna Jarvis  Pediatrician
 Lisa LaFlamme  Broadcast Journalist
 M.G. Venkatesh Mannar  Expert in Food Science Technologies and Nutrition
 Ernest Matton (Little Brown Bear)  Community Capacity Builder and Spiritual Ambassador
 Dennis O'Connor  former Associate Chief Justice of Ontario
 David Pearson  Professor and Promoter of Science Communication
 Fran Rider  Women's Hockey Advocate
 Beverley Salmon  Anti-Racism and Community Activist
 Hugh Segal  Public Servant
 Helga Stephenson  Arts Administrator and Human Rights Activist
 Margo Timmins  Vocalist

Order of British Columbia

 Dr. Allen Eaves
 Saleema Noon
 Janet Austin
 John Mann
 Dr. Peter Wong
 Robert Robinson
 David Sidoo
 Brian R.D. Smith
 Pauline Rafferty
 Frank Giustra
 Kim Baird
 Beverley Boys
 Cornelia Hahn Oberlander
 Marjorie White
 Sandra Richardson
 Dr. Eric M. Yoshida

Alberta Order of Excellence

 Barry Bultz
 Linda Hughes
 Sheldon Kennedy
 Leroy Little Bear
 Michael Massey
 Paulette Patterson
 Shirley Penner
 Bill Yuill

Order of Prince Edward Island

 Ms. Carolyn Bateman
 Keptin John Joe Sark
 Dr. Dagny Dryer

Order of Manitoba

 Paul Albrechtsen
 Marileen Bartlett
 Maria De Nardi
 Dhali H. S. Dhaliwal
 Betsy V. Kennedy
 Gary P. Kobinger
 Wanda Koop
 Reggie Leach
 Bernadette Smith
 Susan A. Thompson
 Wanbdi Wakita

Order of New Brunswick

 Chief Kenneth Barlow
 John P. Barry
 Judith Chernin Budovitch
 Phil Comeau
 Gérard Friolet
 Dr. Abraham Gesner
 Nancy Hartling
 Deborah Lyons
 Jean-Guy Rioux
 Dr. Sheldon H. Rubin

Order of Nova Scotia

 Françoise Elvina Baylis, CM, ONS, PhD, FRSC, FCAHS
 Freeman Douglas Knockwood (Deceased), ONS, DHum (Hon)
 Arthur Bruce McDonald, CC, OOnt, ONS, FRS, FRSC
 James Leonard Morrow, ONS, DHum (Hon)
 Donald R. Reid (Deceased), ONS

Order of Newfoundland and Labrador

 Dr. Noel Browne
 Thomas J. Foran
 William D. Mahoney, OMM, CD
 Melba Rabinowitz
 Philip Riteman, ONS
 Cheryl Stagg
 Kellie Walsh
 The Honourable Clyde K. Wells, QC
 Vincent Withers, CM

Territorial Honours

Order of Nunavut

 Louie Kamookak
 Ellen Hamilton
 Red Pedersen

Order of the Northwest Territories

Nellie Cournoyea
Jan Stirling
Tony Whitford
Marie Wilson

Canadian Bravery Decorations

Star of Courage

 Lester Grant Lehmann
 Constable Curtis Keith Barrett
 Corporal Dany Daigle
 Constable Martin Fraser
 Constable Louis Létourneau
 Sergeant Richard Rozon
 Constable Samearn Son
 Kevin Michael Vickers

Medal of Bravery

 Sergeant Christopher Armstrong
 Cadet Master Seaman Kristianna Barton
 Keven Blanchette
 Rémy Bouchard
 Sergeant Sébastien Briand
 Constable Nicholas-Yan Charbonneau
 Brian Jason Cochrane
 Michel Côté
 Sergeant Claude Cuillerier
 Constable Pascal-Éric D’Amours
 Charles-Antoine Desautels
 Jonathan Desrochers
 Constable Simon Dufour
 Sergeant Steve Duguay
 Constable James Arthur Elvish, M.B. - This is a second award of the Medal of Bravery
 Constable Mathieu Fournier
 Paula Goosen
 Alain Gravel
 Mathieu Gravel
 Gerald Douglas Greenfield
 Constable Steve Guy
 Guy Hawk
 Michael Robert Henderson
 Constable Yannick Horion
 Constable Robert John Hunka
 Constable Ryan Todd Krupa
 Simon Lalonde
 André Larouche
 Sergeant Martin R. LeBlanc
 Bruce D. Leclair
 Constable Yves Leclerc
 Stephen Andrew Lee
 Richard Charles Louthood
 Janice Dianne Lovering
 Constable Andrea MacInnis
 Jason Darcy MacMillan
 Sergeant Jacques Marcheterre
 Constable Francis Marquis
 Dianne E. Matsalla
 Lorne R. Matsalla
 Eric Naud
 Anthony Norman
 Marc Overacker
 Terry James Palaschak
 Constable Dominic Pellerin
 Sergeant Pierre Pellerin
 Constable Jean-François Pépin
 Douglas James Petheram
 Constable Sophie Pilon
 Maurice Poirier
 Stéphane Poirier
 Constable Kristopher Poling
 François Pollak
 Constable Paul-André Rodrigue
 Sergeant Denis Roy
 Randolf Schwindt
 Michael Lloyd Serbinek
 Geraldine Shewchuk
 Phillip Shewchuk
 Gordon S. Smith
 Jordan Brice Smith
 Constable Konstantin Soukatchev
 Constable Myriam St-Onge
 Christian Vaillancourt
 Mario Guy Vaillancourt
 Stephen Vandervelden
 Detective-Sergeant Benoit Vigeant, M.O.M., C.D.
 Inspector Ronald Wheeldon
 Larry Whitty
 Sergeant Brent Douglas Young
 Safaa Baggar
 Constable Michelle Bergeron
 Lilianne Bessette
 Constable Christopher Bolland
 Myles Brown
 Corporal Gary Bubelis
 Constable Somoza Célestin
 Rorey Dee Chamberlain
 Jason Ronald Comeau
 David Del Rosario (posthumous)
 Mike P. K. Devine
 Domenic Dubreuil
 Mina Eglaycus
 Constable Mark Fiset
 Constable Jessie James Fontaine
 Constable Michael Dean Fox
 Lieutenant David Gauvin, C.D.
 Kristjan Gunderson
 Buddy Harwood
 Jesse Haw
 Michael Clayton Heide
 Audrey Gay Hicks
 Kevin Laverne Hiebert
 Justin Patrick Huska
 Constable Kevin Johnson
 Master Corporal Tyler W. Jordan
 Tyrone Josdal
 Randon Joseyounen
 Constable Michael Klarenbeek
 Annick Lajoie
 Constable Amyn Lakha
 Constable Jean-Pierre Lavigne
 Chelsea Little
 Corporal Michael Edward Loerke (retired)
 Michael Conulibang Lumahang (posthumous)
 Chad Lyttle
 Constable Maxim Malo
 Constable Sylvie Marcoux
 Tyrell Winston Neufeld
 Owen O’Connor
 Constable Michel Palmer
 Sylvain Christian Pedneault
 Brent Ian Penner
 James Blair Raoul
 Cindy Leigh Rogers
 Daniel Jordan Ross
 Daryl Roy
 Constable Patrick Ruest
 Sergeant Dwayne Rumbolt, C.D.
 Della Brynn Shore
 David F. R. Smith
 Ean Smith
 Eryn Patricia Smith
 Donald Alan St. Pierre
 Constable Carl Russell Stene
 Constable Charles Thom
 Gordon Paul Kenneth Tourand
 Constable Herbert Waye

Meritorious Service Decorations

Second Award of the Meritorious Service Cross (Military Division)

Meritorious Service Cross (Military Division)

 Colonel Daniel Stewart Constable, M.S.C., C.D.
 Commander Julian Andrew Elbourne, M.S.C., C.D.
 Admiral William E. Gortney, M.S.C. (United States Navy)
 Chief Petty Officer 1st Class Ian Mark Kelly, M.M.M., M.S.C., C.D.
 Colonel Eric Jean Kenny, M.S.C., M.S.M., C.D.
 Lieutenant-Colonel Dwayne Michael Lemon, M.S.C., C.D.
 Lieutenant-Commander Jeffrey Murray, M.S.C., C.D.
 Lieutenant-Colonel Gary O’Neil, M.S.C., C.D.
 Petty Officer 1st Class Micheal Andrew Penner, M.S.C., C.D.
 Colonel Lise Bourgon, M.S.C., C.D.
 Colonel Sean Thomas Boyle, O.M.M., M.S.C., M.S.M., C.D.
 Lieutenant-Colonel Jason Christopher Guiney, M.S.C., C.D.
 Major Robert Paul Joseph Tremblay, M.S.C., C.D.

Meritorious Service Cross (Civil Division)

 Jean-François Archambault
 Michael Burns
 Chief Superintendent Craig Callens
 Jacques CorcosPaul Dubé
 Andréanne Emard
 Leena Evic
 Robert Fowler
 Shaun Francis
 Mike Frastacky (posthumous)
 Sergeant Cris Gastaldo
 Colin Glassco, A.O.E.
 Superintendent Jim Gresham
 Jean-Claude Mahé
 Angéline Martel
 Corporal Ben Maure
 Staff Sergeant Alan McCambridge
 Chris Mowbray
 Mylène Paquette
 David Parsons, O.N.L.
 Inspector Trent Rolfe
 Joseph Rotman, O.C. (posthumous)
 James Stewart (posthumous)
 Morgan Wienberg
 Ray Zahab
 Tom Affleck, M.S.C.
 Carolyn Mitchell Hamilton Pennycook Cross, M.S.C.
 Philip J. Currie, A.O.E., M.S.C.
 Edwina Jarvis Eddy, M.S.C.
 Janeece Edroff, M.S.C.
 Dominick Gauthier, M.S.C.
 Thomas H. Greidanus, M.S.C.
 Jennifer Heil, M.S.C.
 Marcel Lauzière, M.S.C.
 Stephen Ward Leafloor, M.S.C.
 Janet Longmore, M.S.C.
 Staff Sergeant David Frederick McIntyre, M.O.M., M.S.C.
 Lindey Louise McIntyre, M.S.C.
 JD Miller, M.S.C.
 Parker Mitchell, M.S.C.
 Todd Stuart Nicholson, M.S.C.
 George Edward Greenspan Roter, M.S.C.
 Pernell-Karl (P. K.) Sylvester Subban, M.S.C.
 Hannah Taylor, M.S.C.
 Robert A. Walsh, M.S.C.
 Paul A. Young, M.S.C.

Third Award of the Meritorious Service Medal (Military Division)

 Colonel Joseph Albert Paul Pierre St-Cyr, M.S.M., C.D.

Meritorious Service Medal (Military Division)
 Leading Seaman Andrew Christopher Astles, M.S.M.
 Colonel Bradley Scott Pearce Baker, M.S.M., C.D.
 Corporal Kyle Patrick Button, M.S.M.
 Lieutenant-Colonel Brendan Stirling Cook, M.S.M., C.D.
 Sergeant Shaun Edward Delamere, M.S.M., C.D.
 Lieutenant-Colonel Paul Joseph Doyle, M.S.M., C.D.
 Major Allan Ferriss, M.S.M., C.D.
 Honorary Colonel Louis Hugo Francescutti, M.S.M.
 Honorary Captain(N) Fred George, O.N.S., M.S.M.
 Captain Michael Gibbons, M.S.M.
 Lieutenant-Colonel Luc Joseph Girouard, O.M.M., M.S.M., C.D.
 Lieutenant-Colonel Ryan Edward Jurkowski, M.S.M., C.D.
 Leading Seaman Curtis Lee Korolyk, M.S.M.
 Colonel Mario Leblanc, M.S.M., C.D.
 Lieutenant-Colonel David Charles Moar, M.S.M., C.D.
 Lieutenant-Colonel Jonathan James Nelles, M.S.M., C.D.
 Lieutenant-Colonel Robert Michael Poisson, M.S.M., C.D.
 Petty Officer 1st Class Peter Ronald John Storie, M.S.M., C.D.
 Captain Aly Alibhai, M.S.M.
 Captain Charles Bailey, M.S.M., C.D.
 Captain Raphael MacKenzie, M.S.M.
 Lieutenant-Colonel David Pletz, M.S.M., C.D.
 Lieutenant-Colonel Francis William Radiff, M.S.M., C.D.
 Chief Warrant Officer John Garry Short, M.M.M., M.S.M., C.D.
 Lieutenant-Commander Brian Anthony Trager, M.S.M., C.D.

Second Award of the Meritorious Service Medal (Civil Division) 
 Wyatt McWilliams, M.S.M.

Meritorious Service Medal (Civil Division)

 Sergeant Samuel Anderson
 Frank Baillie
 Marc Balevi
 Catherine Baylis
 Martin Bergmann (posthumous)
 Alexandre Bilodeau
 George Bittman (posthumous)
 Jessica Bowden
 Esther Bryan
 Lembi Buchanan
 Sydney Burrows
 Bonnie Buxton
 Hélène Campbell
 Jim Casey
 Frédéric Cassir
 Hubert Chrétien
 Tony Clark (posthumous)
 Dan Claypool
 Mark Cohon, O.Ont.
 Sergeant Alan Comeau
 Andy Cottrell
 Superintendent Stephen Covey
 Peter Cowan
 Geneviève Dechêne
 Elizabeth Elliott (posthumous)
 Mellisa Emblin
 Robert Fetherstonhaugh
 Allison Fisher, O.Ont.
 L. Jean Fournier, C.M., C.Q.
 Sergeant James Giczi
 Gordon Gore
 Erin Gravelle
 Sharon Hapton
 Ian Hinksman
 Joé Juneau
 Anthony Kelly
 Deborah Kerr
 Greg Lagacé
 Jenna Lambert
 Pierre Legault
 David Lemon
 Candice Lys
 Ken MacLeod
 Nancy MacNeill
 Deborah Maskens
 René Matthey (posthumous)
 Murray McCann
 David McGuire
 Brian McKeever
 Robin McKeever
 Kent Nagano
 Paul Nguyen
 Marie-Élaine Patenaude
 Sergeant Dave Patterson
 Luca Patuelli
 Benjamin Peterson
 Brian Philcox
 Owen Rees
 Véronique Rivest
 Louise Russo
 Michael Ruta
 Felix Saint-Denis
 Tom Sampson
 Byron Samson
 Susanne Saunders-Matthey (posthumous)
 John Seymour
 Alexandra Sicotte-Lévesque
 Michael Stevens
 Kim Sutherland
 Lloyd Swick
 Jowi Taylor
 Angelo Towndale
 Rebecca Veevee
 Grégoire Webber
 Lauren Woolstencroft
 Ruslana Wrzesnewskyj
 Paul York
 Berend Zonnenberg
 William Adair, M.S.M.
 Tammy Aristilde, M.S.M.
 Richard James Armstrong, M.S.M.
 Constable Alan Dennis Arsenault, M.S.M.
 Constable Kimberly Anne Ashford, M.B., M.S.M.
 John Michael Baigent, M.S.M.
 Robert Cullimore Blacker, M.S.M.
 Edward M. Brown, M.S.M.
 Michelle Bruce, M.S.M.
 Gavin Buchan, M.S.M.
 Michael Ryan Callan, M.S.M.
 Robert Wendell Clarke, M.S.M., C.D.
 Sandra Clarke, M.S.M.
 Patricia Margaret Crossley, M.S.M.
 Rodney Crossley, M.S.M.
 Ivan X. de Souza, M.S.M.
 Paul Douglas Dickson, M.S.M.
 Armand Calixte Doucet, M.S.M.
 Lee Durdon, M.S.M.
 Geoff Eaton, M.S.M.
 Leonard J. Edwards, M.S.M.
 Nicole Edwards, M.S.M.
 Angela Elster, M.S.M.
 Nicolino Frate, M.S.M.
 Philippe Gélinas, M.S.M.
 Lisa Glithero, M.S.M.
 Karen Kerr Goodyear, M.S.M.
 Corporal Darrel Vincent Gyorfi, M.S.M.
 Superintendent David William Hazelton, M.S.M.
 J. A. Heffernan, M.S.M.
 Fran Herman, M.S.M.
 Matthew Hill, M.S.M.
 Constable Tobin Hinton, M.O.M., M.S.M.
 Zabeen Hirji, M.S.M.
 Philip D. Hiscock, M.S.M.
 Robert Hollett, M.S.M.
 Lenny Hollingsworth, M.S.M.
 Carin Lee Holroyd, M.S.M.
 Jessie Lynn Jollymore, M.S.M.
 Robert Kirkpatrick, M.S.M.
 Joanne Klauke-Labelle, M.S.M. (posthumous)
 Constable David W. Kolb, M.S.M.
 Allan H. Kristofferson, M.S.M.
 Michel Robert Labbé, M.S.M.
 Howe Lee, M.S.M., C.D.
 Major James Gerard Lynch, M.S.M., C.D.
 Leo Kwan Yue Ma, M.S.M.
 Sergeant John Brian MacDonald, M.S.M.
 David James MacIntyre, M.S.M.
 Judy Maddren, M.S.M.
 Laurie Mallery, M.S.M.
 Barbara Ruth Marian, M.S.M.
 Roderick Allister McCulloch, M.S.M.
 Constable Walter Maxwell McKay, M.S.M.
 John Alexander McNee, M.S.M.
 Ranjana Mitra, M.S.M.
 Paige Alison Moorhouse, M.S.M.
 Wendy Morton, M.S.M.
 Constable William Ng, M.S.M.
 Harold J. Paddock, M.S.M.
 Michael Parkhill, O.Ont., M.S.M.
 Vincent Charles Pawis, O.Ont., M.S.M.
 Barry Phippen, M.S.M.
 Stephen E. Rapanos, M.S.M.
 Ron Rock, M.S.M.
 John Ferguson Ronald, M.S.M. (posthumous)
 Alexander George Salki, M.S.M.
 Vincent Matthew Savoia, M.S.M.
 Ellen Schwartz, M.S.M.
 Jeffrey Schwartz, M.S.M.
 Kenneth H. Setterington, M.S.M.
 Aaron Blake Seward, M.S.M.
 Doris Sommer-Rotenberg, M.S.M.
 Michael Stainton, M.S.M.
 Constable Mark Warren Steinkampf, M.S.M.
 Stephanie Tait, M.S.M.
 Jordin John Kudluk Tootoo, M.S.M.
 Julie Toskan-Casale, M.S.M.
 Stan Tu’Inukuafe, M.S.M.
 Theodore van der Zalm Jr., M.S.M.
 Maike van Niekerk, M.S.M.
 Gerald Walsh, M.S.M.
 Penny Walsh McGuire, M.S.M.
 Dale Weidman, M.S.M.
 Constable Rico Tze Leung Wong, M.S.M.
 Peter Manly Wright, M.S.M.
 Terry E. Yates, M.S.M.
 Ralph Barclay Young, M.S.M.
 Anne-Marie Zajdlik, O.Ont., M.S.M.
 Mark Allen Zamorski, M.S.M.

Secret appointments
 4 June 2016: His Excellency the Right Honourable David Johnston, Governor General and Commander-in-Chief of Canada, on the recommendation of the Chief of the Defence Staff, has awarded a Meritorious Service Cross and four Meritorious Service Medals to members of the Canadian Armed Forces for military activities of high standard that have brought great honour to the Canadian Armed Forces and to Canada. For security and operational reasons, the recipient names and citations have not been released.
 12 November 2016 : His Excellency the Right Honourable David Johnston, Governor General and Commander-in-Chief of Canada, on the recommendation of the Chief of the Defence Staff, has awarded a Meritorious Service Cross (Military Division) to a member of the Canadian Armed Forces for military activities of high standard that have brought great honour to the Canadian Armed Forces and to Canada. For security and operational reasons, the recipient's name and citation have not been released.

Polar Medal

 Elisapi Aningmiuq
 Petty Officer 1st Class Yves Bernard
 David Hik
 Marilyn Jensen
 Robie Macdonald
 Lieutenant Cecil Francis May, C.D.
 Donat Savoie
 Peter Suedfeld
 Warwick Vincent

Commonwealth and Foreign Orders, Decorations and Medal awarded to Canadians

From Her Majesty The Queen in Right of the United Kingdom

Member of the Most Excellent Order of the British Empire

 Mr. David Barlow Buik
 Lieutenant-Colonel Gary P. O’Neil

Ebola Medal for Service in West Africa

 Lieutenant(N) Ashley Sarah Atkins
 Corporal David Matthew Balun
 Corporal Michael Allen Barrett
 Corporal Michael J. Bedard
 Master Corporal Nanette Jean Black
 Sergeant Ashley Laurel Black
 Lieutenant(N) Anne Bolduc
 Captain Angela J. Bremner
 Lieutenant Janice Madeline Campbell
 Lieutenant Olivia Ann Carbonneau
 Captain Adrian Conway Carpenter
 Captain Guillaume Charbonneau
 Lieutenant-Colonel Paul Bryan Charlebois
 Lieutenant Sara L. Crabtree
 Sergeant James Edward Craig
 Master Corporal Amanda Marie Crawford
 Captain Jillian E. Cross
 Sergeant Kristopher Stephen Daum
 Sub-Lieutenant Nova T. Dowling
 Captain Samantha A. Drew
 Sub-Lieutenant Susanne M. Erickson
 Lieutenant-Commander Melanie Renee Espina
 Master Warrant Officer Philip Michael Fewer
 Lieutenant-Colonel Colleen Ann Forestier
 Master Warrant Officer John Darren Gallant
 Captain Amy K. Godwin
 Captain Kim Patricia Grimard
 Corporal Donald William Mark Handford
 Corporal Jocelyn L. Hanna
 Corporal Ashley Rebekah Beatrice Harrison
 Master Corporal Vanessa J. Jacobs
 Captain(N) Raymond Liang-chiyu
 Corporal Ryan J. Kristy
 Lieutenant Jessica M. Kuipers
 Major Jennifer Rosa Lawton
 Sergeant Christina Lee Marie Litschel
 Corporal Jillian M. MacDonald
 Sub-Lieutenant Carly J. MacKay
 Lieutenant-Commander Harold D. S. MacLean
 Major Trisha L. MacLeod
 Master Corporal R. N. Jean-François Mahé
 Major Dennis Alain Marion
 Lieutenant(N) Shelly L. Maynard
 Captain Bradley J. McCallum
 Master Corporal John J. McGinn
 Corporal Blair J. McIntyre
 Lieutenant Michelle T. Mills
 Corporal Peter Alexander Milne
 Corporal Michael S. L. Monardo
 Captain Carly Lynn Montpellier
 Lieutenant Tamara D. A. Nevills
 Lieutenant-Commander Leigh H. Nickerson
 Lieutenant-Colonel Gary P. O’Neil
 Master Corporal Janet Laura Osterbeck
 Master Corporal J. F. Jean-Sébastien Pellan
 Lieutenant(N) Timothy J. L. Peppin
 Leading Seaman Allan Michael Philpott
 Lieutenant(N) Jeffery Praught
 Captain Zundel Estodo Quintin
 Captain Harold Rivera
 Lieutenant(N) Cindy M. Rochette
 Corporal Charles Paul John Earle Roper
 Corporal Jonathan A. Santos
 Sergeant Jeffrey J. Scott
 Major Andrea K. Seaby
 Corporal Aidan Shea
 Corporal Jennifer A. Southwell
 Master Seaman Nicole M. Spivey
 Corporal John R. Tait
 Corporal Sigrid S. Tremblay
 Captain Chad L. Turnbull
 Corporal Patrick R. Vanneste
 Sub-Lieutenant Jaime A. Vickers
 Corporal Scot A. Walker
 Warrant Officer John Roy Woodworth
 Captain Terry Andrew Wynn

From the Government of the Republic of Austria

Gold Medal for Services to the Republic of Austria
 Mrs. Ernestine Tadehl

From the President of the Republic of Finland

Knight of the Order of the Lion of Finland

 Mr. Brian Vilho Koivu
 Mr. Niilo Kustaa Saari

From the President of the French Republic

Commander of the National Order of the Legion of Honour

 General Thomas J. Lawson, C.M.M., C.D. (Retired)
 The Right Honourable Brian Mulroney, P.C., C.C., G.O.Q.

Officer of the National Order of the Legion of Honour
 Mr. Robert Pichette
 Lieutenant-General Marquis Hainse
 Mr. Gil Rémillard

Knight of the National Order of the Legion of Honour
 Mr. Alban d’Amours
 Mr. Robert Panet-Raymond

Officer of the National Order of Merit

 Lieutenant-General Stuart Beare

National Medal of Recognition for victims of terrorism

Officer of the Order of Arts and Letters

Commander of the Order of the Academic Palms

Knight of the Order of the Academic Palms
 Mr. Serge Guimond
 Mr. Michel de Waele
 Ms. Lucie Lequin

Knight of the Order of Agricultural Merit

 Mr. Martin Gosselin

National Defence Medal, Gold Echelon

National Defence Medal, Bronze Echelon
 Colonel Guy Savard

From the President of the Republic of Italy

Commander of the Order of the Star of Italy
 Mr. Palmacchio Di Iulio

From the President of the Republic of Haiti

Grand Cross of the National Order of Honour and Merit, Silver Plaque

 The Honourable Mauril Adrien Jules Bélanger, P.C.

From the President of Hungary

Commander’s Cross with Star of the Order of Merit of the Republic of Hungary (Civil Division)

 Mr. Peter Munk

Officer’s Cross of the Order of Merit of Hungary (Civil Division)
 Mr. Tibor Abraham

Knight’s Cross of the Order of Merit of Hungary (Civil Division)
 M. John Barakso
 Ms. Linda Hasenfratz
 Mr. Andrew Saxton
 Mr. Gyula Szentmihaly

Gold Cross of Merit of the Republic of Hungary (Civil Division)
 Ms. Olga Borbely

Silver Cross of Merit of the Republic of Hungary (Civil Division)
 Ms. Tunde Torok
 Ms. Eva Masszi Tomory

From the President of Lithuania

Order of Merit of Lithuania
 Mr. Ginutis Procuta

From the His Royal Highness The Grand Duke of Luxembourg

Officer of the Order of Merit of Luxembourg
 Mr. Robert Allan Philipps

Knight of the Order of the Oak Crown
 Mr. Ron Bozzer

From His Majesty The Emperor of Japan

Order of the Rising Sun, Gold and Silver Star

 Mr. Leonard John Edwards

Order of the Rising Sun, Gold Rays with Neck Ribbon
 Mr. Victor Leyland Young

Order of the Rising Sun, Gold Rays with Rosette
 Dr. X. Jie Yang

Order of the Rising Sun, Gold and Silver Rays
 Mr. Robert Tadashi Banno

From the President of Mexico

Order of the Aztec Eagle, Insignia Grade
 Mr. James Erwin Downey
 Mr. Colin Robertson

From His Majesty The King of the Netherlands

Commemorative Medal for Peace Operations with ATFME Clasp
 Captain Brian J. Coyle

Medal for Peace Operations, Second Clasp
 Captain Brian J. Coyle

From the President of the Republic of Poland

Knight’s Cross of the Order of Polonia Restituta

 Mr. Jan Zaklikowski
 Mr. Stanislaw Adam
 Ms. Albina Polatynska

Officer’s Cross of the Order of Merit of the Republic of Poland

to Mr. Andrzej Kawka

Knight’s Cross of the Order of Merit of the Republic of Poland

 Mr. Fernand de Varennes
 Mr. Lech Galezowski
 Mr. Stanislaw Majerski
 Mr. Henryk Miszczak

Cross of Freedom and Solidarity

 Mr. Ryszard Fryga
 Mr. Jan Zaklikowski

Gold Cross of Merit

 Ms. Renata Sieranska

Silver Cross of Merit

 Mr. Antony Kozlowski

Silver Medal for Long Service

Siberian Exiles Cross
 Mr. Stanislaw Zylka

Long Marital Life Medal

From the Government of Portugal

Commander of the Order of Merit of Portugal
 Mr. Louis F. de Melo

From the President of Romania

Officer of the National Order of Merit (Civil Division)
 Mr. Corneliu Chisu

From His Majesty The King of Spain

Officer of the Order of Civil Merit
 Mr. Austin Cooke

From the President of the United States of America

Officer of the Legion of Merit
 

 Captain(N) Richard P. Gravel
 Brigadier-General Dean J. Milner
 Colonel David A. Rundle
 Brigadier-General Carl J. Turenne
 Brigadier-General Joseph Jean René Guy Hamel
 Brigadier-General Paul Rutherford
 Lieutenant-General Marquis Hainse
 Brigadier-General Derek A. Macaulay

Legionnaire of the Legion of Merit 

 Colonel Mark Misener

Bronze Star Medal

 Colonel Mark Misener

Defence Meritorious Service Medal

 Major Kelly Chow
 Major Jacqueline M. Cowley
 Lieutenant-Colonel Craig M. Flood
 Petty Officer 1st Class Scott O. Peddle
 Major Sherry A. Macleod
 Commander Brian D. Murray
 Lieutenant-Colonel David E. MacGillivary
 Colonel Darren E. Turner
 Major Kendra A. Hartery
 Lieutenant-Colonel Douglas M. Kromrey

Meritorious Service Medal

 Lieutenant-Colonel Byron Conway
 Major Michael Fawcett
 Major Lance Hoffe
 Major Joshua Riley
 Major Mathieu Gauthier
 Major Edith Miller
 Major Gerhard Hildebrandt
 Master Warrant Officer Giorgio N. Frausin
 Colonel Jacques J. Morneau
 Colonel Paul E. Ormsby
 Lieutenant-Colonel Sean J. Duggan
 Colonel J. P. Yvan Boilard
 Lieutenant-Colonel Steve Chouinard
 Lieutenant-Colonel Brian Erickson
 Major Andriy W. Szkwarek
 Major Nicholas Williams

Air Medal

 Captain Gabriel J. Hanselpacker

From the President of the Republic of Zambia

Order of Distinguished Service (First Division)
 Mr. Colin B. Glassco

Erratums of Commonwealth and Foreign Orders, Decorations and Medal awarded to Canadians

Corrected on 02 July 2016
 From the President of the United States of America, Meritorious Service Medal, First Oak Leaf Cluster to Lieutenant-Colonel Sean J. Duggan.

Corrected on 27 August 2016
 From the Government of the United States of America, the Meritorious Service Medal, First Oak Leaf Cluster to Colonel J. P. Yvan Boilard

References 

Monarchy in Canada
2016 awards in Canada